The northern broad-footed mole (Scapanus latimanus) is a species of mammal in the family Talpidae. It is endemic to the United States, where it is found in northern California, Nevada and Oregon at elevations up to 3000 m above sea level.

Taxonomy 
Formerly, this species was thought to have a wider range reaching down to northernmost Baja California, Mexico, with a disjunct population further south in Sierra de San Pedro Martir. However, taxonomic and morphological studies indicate that the subspecies in southern California and northernmost Baja California is a distinct species, the southern broad-footed mole (S. occultus) and the Sierra de San Pedro Martir subspecies is also a distinct species, the Mexican mole (S. anthonyi). Due to this, the range of S. latimanus is thought to be restricted to the United States.

Up to 12 subspecies of S. latimanus have been recognized, but S. anthonyi and S. occultus have been split as distinct species. Analysis of the remaining subspecies have found that most of them represent junior synonyms of other subspecies; under this classification, only 4 subspecies of S. latimanus remain: S. l. latimanus, S. l. minisculus, S. l. insularis, and S. l. parvus.

Description
The broad-footed mole can be distinguished from other species of Scapanus by its dark brown to silvery fur, and 40-44 unevenly spaced unicuspid teeth. Adults range from 14 to 18 cm in total length on average, with males slightly larger than females. Populations in more humid environments also tend to have larger individuals than those from southern, drier areas.

Its karyotype has 2n = 34, FN = 64.
As with most moles, it requires moist, friable soils, where it eats earthworms, insects, other invertebrates and some plant matter.

Scapanus latimanus is a fossorial mammal, living below ground for most of its life. Only one animal occupies a burrow at a time and if a burrow has been vacated, it is often reoccupied within 2 days. Tunnels are typically dug far below surface level and the excess earth is removed via shafts that run laterally and vertically up to the surface. The excess earth pushed out of these shafts form distinct volcano-shaped mounds with the older earth towards the outer base and the newer earth towards the core. Shallow surface tunnels are sometimes dug and form a ridge in the soil on the surface. How often exactly these tunnels are used is unknown, as they are used irregularly.

References

Scapanus
Mammals of the United States
Endemic fauna of the United States
Mammals described in 1842
Taxonomy articles created by Polbot
Taxa named by John Bachman